Simon Brendle (born June 1981) is a German mathematician working in differential geometry and nonlinear partial differential equations. He received his Dr. rer. nat. from Tübingen University under the supervision of Gerhard Huisken (2001). He was a professor at Stanford University (2005–2016), and is currently a professor at Columbia University. He has held visiting positions at MIT, ETH Zürich, Princeton University, and Cambridge University.

Contributions to mathematics

Simon Brendle has solved major open problems regarding the Yamabe equation in conformal geometry. This includes his counterexamples to the compactness conjecture for the Yamabe problem, and the proof of the convergence of the Yamabe flow in all dimensions (conjectured by Richard Hamilton). In 2007, he proved the differentiable sphere theorem (in collaboration with Richard Schoen), a fundamental problem in global differential geometry. In 2012, he proved the Hsiang–Lawson's conjecture, a longstanding problem in minimal surface theory. He has also worked on singularity formation in the mean curvature flow and Ricci flow, solving a question concerning the uniqueness of self-similar solutions to the Ricci flow which arose in the context of Grigori Perelman's work.

Honors and awards

For his contributions to differential geometry he was awarded an EMS Prize in 2012. He delivered the 2012 Euler Lecture and the 2011 Takagi Lectures. He received an Alfred P. Sloan Fellowship in 2006. In December 2013, he was named as the recipient of the Bôcher Prize of the American Mathematical Society. In 2017, he received a Simons Investigator Award and the Fermat Prize.

Main publications
Blow-up phenomena for the Yamabe equation, Journal of the AMS 21, pp. 951–979, 2008 
Convergence of the Yamabe flow in dimension 6 and higher, Inventiones Mathematicae 170, pp. 541–576, 2007 
(joint with R. Schoen) Manifolds with 1/4 pinched curvature are space forms, Journal of the AMS, 22, 2009, pp. 287 (Differentiable Sphere Theorem) 
Ricci Flow and the Sphere Theorem, American Mathematical Society, Graduate Studies in Mathematics, vol. 111, 2010
(joint with R. Schoen) Curvature, sphere theorem and the Ricci flow, Bulletin of the AMS, 48, 2011, pp. 1–32, Online
(joint with R. Schoen) Riemannian manifolds of positive curvature, Proceedings of the International Congress of Mathematicians (ICM 2010), Hyderabad, India, August 19–27, 2010. Vol. I, pp. 449–475, 2011
(joint with F. C. Marques, A. Neves) Deformations of the hemisphere that increase scalar curvature, Inventiones Mathematicae 185, 2011, pp. 175–197, Preprint (Min-Oo Conjecture)
Rotational symmetry of self-similar solutions to the Ricci flow Inventiones Mathematicae 194, 2013, pp. 731–764 
Embedded self-similar shrinkers of genus 0, Annals of Mathematics 183, 715-728 (2016) Preprint

References

External links

1981 births
Living people
Differential geometers
21st-century German mathematicians
University of Tübingen alumni
Stanford University Department of Mathematics faculty
Sloan Research Fellows
Columbia University faculty
Simons Investigator